Defined by Struggle is an album by the metalcore band Nodes of Ranvier, released in 2007. It was the band's final album.

The album was the band's first to be released by Victory Records. The album art was created by the artist Dennis Sibeijn.

Critical reception
Exclaim! wrote that "the breakdowns pummel, the hardcore is heavy, the metallic overtones are there ... But it's time for a new sound."

Track listing
"Sermon"
"Valjean"
"Endless Faith"
"Purpose in Pain"
"Wrathbearer"
"Defined by Struggle"
"Archegos"
"Sergeant Sorrow"
"Nagheenanajar"
"Confront"
"Infidelity"

Personnel
Josh Ferrie – drums
Kyle Benecke  – vocals
Jake Stefek – guitar
Jon Parker – guitar
Brady Murphy – bass guitar

References

2007 albums
Nodes of Ranvier (band) albums
Victory Records albums